Wendy Valdez-Garcia (born June 2, 1982) is a Filipina beauty queen, former Pinoy Big Brother: Season 2 contestant, and an actress.

Biography
Valdez grew up in Navotas. Valdez serves as her family's breadwinner. She claims she is going to do everything she has to do to help her family out. She has already done a couple of commercials and attempted to work in Japan. Both times she went to Japan, though, she suffered from homesickness. Still, in an effort to improve her family's life, she auditioned for the popular Filipino television series Pinoy Big Brother.

In 2005, Valdez joined the Binibining Pilipinas beauty pageant and placed as Binibining Pilipinas Tourism, with Gionna Cabrera, Binibining Pilipinas Universe, Carlene Aguilar Binibining Pilipinas World, and Precious Lara Quigaman who placed as Binibining Pilipinas International.

She was one of the original housemates to enter the Big Brother house of the second season and she was most regarded as the "Bad Girl" of the house. She was also popular for having a relationship with fellow housemate Bruce Quebral. Valdez proved that being the most-hated girl does not mean people will not vote for you. Though her negative image were what people thought would hurt her chances of winning, many people claim that her placing over fellow housemate and in-house nemesis Gee-Ann was brought about by the public's interest to see a real person.

She graduated from Far Eastern University in 2007 with a degree of Bachelor of Arts in Mass Communication. In 2009, she married Bruce Quebral, only to annul four months later.

After Pinoy Big Brother
Although 3rd placer, Valdez got a big break with numerous offers and contracts, especially from ABS-CBN. She had the lead role as Margarita in Margarita, a teleserye of ABS-CBN and had a relationship with Bruce Quebral.

Filmography

Television

References

External links
 

1982 births
Living people
Pinoy Big Brother contestants
Binibining Pilipinas winners
Filipino film actresses
People from Navotas
Actresses from Metro Manila
Filipino female models
Star Magic
Far Eastern University alumni